3-keto-steroid reductase is an enzyme that in humans is encoded by the HSD17B7 gene.

The 17-beta-hydroxysteroid dehydrogenase enzyme (EC 1.1.1.62) oxidizes or reduces estrogens and androgens in mammals and regulates the biologic potency of these steroids.[supplied by OMIM]

References

Further reading